WOMM-LP (105.9 FM) is a federally licensed, low-power, non-commercial community radio station based in Burlington, Vermont.  WOMM features a variety of formatted shows driven by the on-air personalities who staff the station.  It uses the slogan "The Radiator, Burlington's community radio station broadcasting with 100 watts of fury."

WOMM has a 100-watt mono signal and broadcasts within Chittenden County, Vermont.  Its broadcasts can also be received through its website, www.theradiator.org.  The station was conceived in the early 2000s by Lee Anderson and Jim Lockridge and began broadcast in late 2007.  The broadcast studios are located at 351 North Avenue, Burlington, Vermont in the offices of Big Heavy World, a non-profit music organization.

There are more than 70 volunteers on the staff.

Programming
The format of WOMM is variety and features a daily programming schedule which may range from heavy rock and punk to classical and talk, depending on the personalities currently on the station.  Each show may be scheduled for a period of 1 to 3 hours in length.

Current programming on WOMM includes "The Real Caribbean", "Write the Book", "Rocketshop", "The Howie Rose Variety Show", "Blue Suede Rock", "DJ Jay's Mix Tape Hour" and "The Sports Machine".

See also
List of community radio stations in the United States

References

External links
 Radiator home page
 FM Low Power database
 Bolles, Dan "Radiation Therapy. Low-power but high-minded, 105.9 FM The Radiator builds up steam in Burlington."
 
 Thurston, Jack, "New radio stations dedicated to spinning local songs." WCAX-TV channel 3, Burlington Vermont
 Picard, Ken, "FCC’s New Rules Governing Low-Power FM ‘Fundamentally Unfair’"

OMM-LP
OMM-LP
Community radio stations in the United States
Radio stations established in 2007
2007 establishments in Vermont